Petriashvili is a Georgian surname literally meaning "son of Peter". Notable people with the surname include:

Alex Petriashvili (born 1970), Georgian politician
Geno Petriashvili (born 1994), Georgian wrestler

Georgian-language surnames
Surnames from given names